Touch is the first extended play by South Korean-Chinese girl group Miss A. It was released on February 20, 2012. The album contains six new tracks. The song Touch served as its lead single.

Only track no.1: Touch and track no.5: Over U were later added on Miss A's second album Hush

Background
Miss A announced their comeback in Korea with a new mini-album called "Touch", that is confirmed to be released on February 20, 2012. On February 19, 2012, the music video was uploaded to YouTube through Miss A's official channel and gained over one million views in two days.

Release and promotion
The full mini-album was released on February 20, 2012. Promotions for "Touch" began on February 23, 2012, on M! Countdown. They ended their promotions by performing the second single  "Over U" during their last week leading towards April 1, 2012.

Track listing

Charts

Sales

References 

Miss A albums
2012 EPs
Dance-pop EPs
Korean-language EPs
JYP Entertainment EPs
KMP Holdings EPs